Jill Marsden (born 1964) is a scholar of the work of German philosopher Friedrich Wilhelm Nietzsche. Marsden, from Nottingham, took her BA, MA and PhD from the University of Essex. Her doctoral thesis explored Nietzsche's Doctrine of Eternal Return.

In 2002, Marsden's first book, After Nietzsche: Notes Towards a Philosophy of Ecstasy, was published by Palgrave Macmillan. The text explores the imaginative possibilities for philosophy created by Nietzsche's sustained reflection on the phenomenon of "ecstasy". From The Birth of Tragedy (1872) to his experimental "physiology of art", Nietzsche examines the aesthetic, erotic and sacred dimensions of rapture, hinting at how an ecstatic philosophy is realized in his elusive doctrine of Eternal Return. Marsden's book pursues the implications of this legacy for contemporary continental thought via analyses of such voyages in ecstasy as Kant, Schopenhauer, Schreber and Bataille.

Marsden is Professor of Literature and Philosophy at the University of Bolton. She is at work on her second volume, set to explore 'the art of brevity'. Outside of her work on Nietzsche, Marsden's research interests include aesthetics, feminism and literature, on which themes she has published articles in, among others, the Journal of the British Society for Phenomenology and Women's Philosophy Review.

External links
 Jill Marsden at University of Bolton

English philosophers
Academics of the University of Bolton
English women philosophers
Writers from Nottingham
Living people
1964 births
Nietzsche scholars
21st-century British philosophers
Philosophers of art
21st-century English educators